Miguashaia is a genus of prehistoric lobe-finned fish which lived during the Devonian period. Miguashaia is the most primitive coelacanth fish.

See also

List of prehistoric bony fish

References

Prehistoric lobe-finned fish genera
Devonian bony fish
Devonian fish of Europe